The Clare Valley Racecourse is a racecourse near Stanley Flat, South Australia.

In the early 1880s an annual New Year's Day race meeting took place on a number of local properties in the Clare Valley. Since then, the Clare Valley Racing Club has increased its race dates to three or four annually.

Regular events include Clare Valley Easter Races, April Clare Cup, and races in November.

References

External links 
https://web.archive.org/web/20081122044412/http://www.trsa.com.au/clubs/clare.html
Armagh Renews SA Apprentice Series

Horse racing venues in Australia
Mid North (South Australia)